Franciscus Hogenbirk (18 March 1918 – 13 September 1998) was a Dutch football midfielder who was a member of the Netherlands' squad at the 1938 FIFA World Cup. However, he never made an appearance for the national team. He also played for Be Quick 1887 and coached the team in the 1950s.

References

External links
 FIFA profile

1918 births
1998 deaths
Dutch footballers
Association football midfielders
Be Quick 1887 players
1938 FIFA World Cup players
Dutch football managers
Be Quick 1887 managers
Footballers from Groningen (city)